SJJ may refer to:
 St. John's Jesuit High School and Academy, Toledo, Ohio
 Sarajevo International Airport, IATA code: SJJ